Campeonato Mineiro (lower levels) may refer to:

Campeonato Mineiro Módulo II, Minas Gerais state football second tier
Campeonato Mineiro Segunda Divisão, Minas Gerais state football third tier